Vitla Manohar is an Indian music director, lyricist, film director and actor in Kannada and Tulu movies. He has scored music to several Kannada and Tulu films. He has written lyrics to more than 1000 songs in Kannada cinema.

Early life
Manohar is a native of Vitla village in Dakshina Kannada district of Karnataka state in India. His father is Shivanna bhat, mother Padmavathi. He started his career as a cartoonist working for some leading newspapers and magazines.

Film career

Manohar has composed music for over 100 Kannada movies such as Gejje Naada, O Mallige, Indra Danush, Janumada Jodi, Tharle Nan Maga, Swasthick, Duniya, Ee Sambhaashane, Banda nan Ganda, Janumada Gelathi, and Mathadana. His song "Kolu Mande" from the movie Janumada Jodi is considered to be one of the most successful Kannada songs of the 90s. The song "Kariya I Love you" from the movie "Duniya" is one of his biggest hits.

His first song as a lyricist was "Hodeya Doora Oh Jothegaara" from the movie Anubhava.

Awards

 2015 - Tulu Cinemotsava Award for Best Music Director - Chaali Polilu
 2014 - Red FM Tulu Film Award for Best Lyricist - Barke
 2013 - Tulu Cinemotsava Award for Best Music Director - Bangarda Kural
 2007 - Filmfare Award for Best Lyricist - Kannada - "Kannallu Neenene" (Film:Pallakki)
 2004 - Karnataka State Film Award for Best Music Director -Chigurida Kanasu
 1997 - Karnataka State Film Award for Best Music Director - Jodi Hakki
 1996 - Karnataka State Film Award for Best Music Director - Janumada Jodi
 1995 - Karnataka State Film Award for Best Lyricist - "O Mallige Ninnondige" (Film: Anuraaga Sangama)
 1993 - Karnataka State Film Award for Best Lyricist - "Megha O Megha" (Film: Gejje Naada)

Discography

Actor
Om (1995)
Operation Antha (1995)
Anuraga Sangama (1995)
Upendra (1999)
Kanasugara (2001)
Superstar (2002)
Gokarna (2003)
Mata (2006)
Snehitaru (2012)
Anna Bond (2012)
Anjani Putra (2017)
Govinda Govinda (2021)

References
https://saakshatv.com/campus-kranti-movie-launch-by-power-star/
 http://www.daijiworld.com/news/news_disp.asp?n_id=278873

Living people
Kannada film score composers
Indian male songwriters
Kannada film directors
Male actors in Kannada cinema
Indian male film actors
Kannada-language lyricists
20th-century Indian composers
21st-century Indian composers
People from Dakshina Kannada district
Film musicians from Karnataka
Male actors from Karnataka
Male film score composers
20th-century male musicians
21st-century male musicians
Year of birth missing (living people)